The Mountain Villa with Embracing Beauty (Suzhou Wu: Gue seu se tsaon) is a Chinese garden located on 272 Jingde Rd., inside the Embroidery Museum in Suzhou, Jiangsu, China. In 1997, it was recognized with other classical Suzhou gardens as a UNESCO World Heritage Site.

History
The history of the Mountain Villa with Embracing Beauty may date back to the Jin dynasty (266–420), when Education Minister Wang Xun and his brother Wang Min donated their residential house to build Jingde Temple. Later during Five Dynasties era, it became Jingu Garden, owned by Qian Yuanliao, son of the emperor of Wuyue Kingdom, Qian Liu. In the Song dynasty, it was the pharmaceutical garden of Zhu Changwen, a scholar. In following centuries, it was rebuilt several times. In the Jiajing era of the Ming dynasty, it became the Xuedao Academy of Classical Literature, and later, the office of provisions supervisor. In 1573, it was the residence of Grand Councilor, Sheng Shixing. In the late Ming dynasty and early Qing dynasty, his descendant, Sheng Jikui, built Qu Garden here.

During the Qianlong era of the Qing dynasty, it was the residence of Jiang Ji, director of Jurisdiction Department. Jiang built Qiuzi Tower, and piled stones to form a rockery behind it. He dug the ground to three feet, and a spring emerged and created a pond, called Flying Snow. Other houses and pavilions were also erected. The garden subsequently was owned by Bi Yuan, the Imperial Secretary of State, and Sun Shiyi, the Chief Counselor. Sun's grandson Sun Jun, in 1807, asked rockery master Ge Yuliang to rebuild this garden. Ge built the rockery within a field of half mu (0.08 acre) while the effect was overwhelming as if it spread for many li. The garden gained its reputation for its rockery ever since. Wang Zhou, Director of Works, bought the garden and renamed it Mountain Villa of Embraced Beauty. In 1949 the garden became property of the government and in 1988 was declared a major historic site.

Design 
The 2,180 m2 garden is composed along a linear axis with three main elements: a grotto called Autumn Hill, and Flying Snow Pool, fed by a waterfall called Flying Snow Spring, and a main hall. The rock work in this garden displays every technique and effect used in Chinese gardens. In addition, it is a recreation of the five important mountains of China, and shows a mastery of creating a sense of vast space in a small area.

See also
Chinese garden
Suzhou

Notes

References

External links

Classical Gardens of Suzhou, UNESCO's official website on World Heritage Site.

Classical Gardens of Suzhou
Major National Historical and Cultural Sites in Jiangsu
World Heritage Sites in China